Buenos Aires is a district of the Buenos Aires canton, in the Puntarenas province of Costa Rica.

History 
Buenos Aires was created on 26 June 1914 by Ley 31.

The district was originally inhabited by the Boruca natives. The settlement of peoples of Europeans descent began in 1870, when they began building a road from El Guarco to Boruca. Some settlements of different indigenous people of the region are found in the district (Bribri, Boruca and Cabecares).

Geography 
Buenos Aires has an area of  km² and an elevation of  metres.

Geographically, the district is situated between the Térraba and El Dique rivers and the Talamanca mountain range. One of the attractions of the place are perfectly formed spherical granite rocks.

Locations
Administrative center of the district is the town of Buenos Aires.

Other villages are Alto Alejo, Alto Brisas, Alto Calderón, Ánimas, Bajo Brisas, Bolas, Brujo, Cabagra (parte), Caracol, Ceibo, Colepato, Florida, Guanacaste, Guadalupe, López, Los Altos, Llano Verde, Machomontes, Palmital, Paso Verbá, Piñera, Platanares, Potrero Cerrado, Puente de Salitre, Río Azul, Salitre, San Carlos, San Miguel Este, San Miguel Oeste, San Vicente, Santa Cruz, Santa Eduvigis, Sipar, Ujarrás and Villahermosa.

Demographics 

For the 2011 census, Buenos Aires had a population of  inhabitants.

Transportation

Road transportation 
The district is covered by the following road routes:
 National Route 2 (Pan-American Highway)
 National Route 246
 National Route 610

Airport
The city has an airfield, named BAI.

Economy
The economy is dominated by tourism and the cultivation of pineapple. Interesting eco-tourism offers exist, for example, accommodating tourists in the indigenous peoples towns, and taking courses in organic agriculture.

Future
There are plans to build a dam on the river Térraba to generate electricity. This would create a lake of considerable dimensions. This project has so far not been carried out due to lack of funding, as well as the opposition of certain indigenous groups.

References 

Districts of Puntarenas Province
Populated places in Puntarenas Province